Furley is an unincorporated community in Sedgwick County, Kansas, United States.  As of the 2020 census, the population of the community and nearby areas was 39.  It is located northwest of the intersection of Greenwich Road and 101st Street N, along the Union Pacific Railroad.

History

19th century
In 1887, the Chicago, Kansas and Nebraska Railway built a branch line north–south from Herington through Furley to Caldwell.  By 1893, this branch line was incrementally built to Fort Worth, Texas.  It foreclosed in 1891 and was taken over by Chicago, Rock Island and Pacific Railway, which shut down in 1980 and reorganized as Oklahoma, Kansas and Texas Railroad, merged in 1988 with Missouri Pacific Railroad, and finally merged in 1997 with Union Pacific Railroad.  Most locals still refer to this railroad as the "Rock Island".

A post office was opened in Furley in 1887, and remained in operation until it was discontinued in 1953.

Geography
Furley is located at  (37.8791795, -97.2128162).

Demographics

For statistical purposes, the United States Census Bureau has defined this community as a census-designated place (CDP).

Education
The community is served by Remington USD 206 public school district.  The Remington High School mascot is a Bronco.
 Frederic Remington High School at 8850 NW Meadowlark Road, north of Brainerd.
 Remington Middle School at 316 E Topeka Street in Whitewater.
 Remington Elementary School at 200 E Ellis Avenue in Potwin.

Infrastructure

Transportation
I-135 highway is approximately 6 miles west of the community.  The Union Pacific Railroad runs through Furley.

Utilities
 Internet
 Wireless is provided by Pixius Communications.
 Satellite is provided by HughesNet, StarBand, WildBlue.
 TV
 Satellite is provided by DirecTV, Dish Network.
 Terrestrial is provided by regional digital TV stations.
 Water
 Rural is provided by Sedgwick County RWD #2 and Harvey County RWD #1 (map).

References

Further reading

External links
 Sedgwick County maps: Current, Historic, KDOT

Unincorporated communities in Kansas
Unincorporated communities in Sedgwick County, Kansas